Madison Thompson (born 11 August 1994) is an indoor and field hockey player from Canada, who plays as a forward.

Personal life
Madison Thompson was born and raised in Waterloo, Ontario.

Thompson was a student at Kent State University.

Career

Indoor hockey
Thompson made her debut for the Canada Indoor team in 2013 in a test series against the United States in Feasterville.

During her indoor career, Thompson has won gold and silver medals at the 2014 and 2021 editions of the Indoor Pan American Cup, respectively.

Field hockey
Following years in the indoor program, Thompson made her senior international debut in 2021 during a test series against the United States in Chula Vista.

In 2022 she represented the Canada at the Pan American Cup in Santiago, where she won a bronze medal.

References

External links

1994 births
Living people
Canadian female field hockey players
Female field hockey forwards
20th-century Canadian women
21st-century Canadian women